Manfredonia  is a town and commune of Apulia, Italy, in the province of Foggia, from which it is  northeast by rail. Manfredonia is situated on the coast, facing east, to the south of Monte Gargano, and gives its name to the gulf to the east of it.  its population was 56,932.

History
 
The area of current Manfredonia was settled in ancient times by the Greeks, founded by Diomedes. The flourishing Greek colony, having fallen into the hands of the Samnites, was retaken about 335 BC by King Alexander of Epirus, uncle of Alexander the Great.
 
In 189 BC Sipontum was conquered by the Romans and became a colony of citizens. It was a port at the junction of the road which basically followed the Adriatic coast (but giving the Garganus mountain's peninsula just north a miss) and a road through Arpi, Luceria, Aecae and Aequum Tuticum connecting at Beneventum to the Via Appia.

In AD 663 it was taken and destroyed by the Slavs (Narentines). In the 9th century, Sipontum was for a time in the power of the Saracens.

In 1042 the Normans made it the seat of one of their twelve counties, while the Monte Gargano remained Byzantine. The Normans won a decisive victory there over the Byzantine general Argyrus in 1052.
Siponto was an archbishopric in the Norman countship of Apulia.
 
Having become unhealthy owing to the stagnation of the water in the lagoons after the 1223 earthquake, Siponto was abandoned.
The modern city of Manfredonia was built by King Manfred between 1256–1263, several kilometers north of the ruins of the ancient Sipontum. The Angevins, who had defeated Manfred and stripped him of the Kingdom of Sicily, renamed it Sypontum Novellum ("New Sypontum"), but that name never stuck.
 
In 1528 Manfredonia resisted a French attack led by the Viscount of Lautrec. In 1620 it was destroyed by the Turks, who left only the castle and part of the walls.

Geography
Manfredonia is located in south of Gargano. It borders with the municipalities of Carapelle, Cerignola, Foggia, Monte Sant'Angelo, San Giovanni Rotondo, San Marco in Lamis and Zapponeta.

It counts 7 civil parishes (frazioni): Borgo Mezzanone, Riviera Sud (Sciali and Ippocampo), Pastini, Ruggiano, San Salvatore, Siponto and Tomaiuolo.

Main sights

The medieval castle, begun by the Hohenstaufen and completed by the Angevins, and parts of the town walls are well preserved. The castle received a new line of walls in the 15th century

In the church of San Domenico, the Chapel of the Maddalena contains old paintings of the 14th century.

Three kilometers to the southwest is the former Siponto Cathedral, now the Basilica of Santa Maria Maggiore di Siponto, built in 1117 in the Romanesque style, with a dome and crypt.

The Abbey of San Leonardo in Lama Volara, nearer to Foggia, belonging to the Teutonic Order, is of the same date.

Manfredonia is also the location of the seat of the Archbishopric of Manfredonia-Vieste-S. Giovanni Rotondo in Manfredonia Cathedral, rebuilt in about 1600 after the destruction by the Turks of its 13th-century predecessor.

Transport

Manfredonia railway station is the terminal of the Foggia-Manfredonia line. Other stations serving the municipal territory are Manfredonia Città (closed), Siponto (in the homonymous village), Frattarolo, Candelaro and Amendola.

People
Laurence of Siponto (died 545), bishop, saint, patron of Manfredonia
Vettor Pisani (1324–1380), Venetian admiral 
Pino Rucher (1924–1996), guitarist and arranger

See also
Manfredonia Calcio
1976 Manfredonia accidental release of arsenic
Manfredonia Molo di Levante Lighthouse

References

Sources
A. Beltramelli, Il Gargano (Bergamo, 1907)
Westermann, Großer Atlas zur Weltgeschichte

External links

Manfredonia official website
Manfredonia News
Manfredonia News "Stato Quotidiano"

 
Cities and towns in Apulia
Castles in Italy
1256 establishments in Europe
13th-century establishments in Italy
Coastal towns in Apulia